Ioana Maria Aluaş (née Dinea, born 18 June 1975) is a Romanian former judoka who competed in the 2000 Summer Olympics and in the 2004 Summer Olympics.

References

External links
 
 

1975 births
Living people
Romanian female judoka
Olympic judoka of Romania
Judoka at the 2000 Summer Olympics
Judoka at the 2004 Summer Olympics